Cichorium endivia is a species of flowering plant belonging to the genus Cichorium, which is widely cultivated as one of the species of similar bitter-leafed vegetables known as endive and escarole.

There is considerable confusion between C. endivia and C. intybus.

References

External links
 Endive and chicory

Cichorieae
Plants described in 1753
Taxa named by Carl Linnaeus
Leaf vegetables